North Kerry or Kerry North may refer to:
 The northern part of County Kerry, in Ireland
 North Kerry (UK Parliament constituency), former UK Parliament constituency
 Kerry North (Dáil constituency), former constituency for elections to Dáil Éireann, Ireland

See also
 Limerick–Tralee line, also known as the North Kerry line.
 North Kerry Way, a long-distance trail in County Kerry, Ireland